Live at Plymouth Guildhall is a live album (2-CD set) by the band King Crimson, released through the King Crimson Collectors' Club on the Discipline Global Mobile label in December 2000.  The album was recorded at the Guildhall in Plymouth, UK on 11 May 1971.

This concert was the fifth ever live performance by the Islands version of King Crimson.  The CD release was adapted from the original soundboard tape, mixed by Peter Sinfield.  An audience bootleg was added to repair the missing introduction to "Get Thy Bearings".

The liner notes were written by drummer Ian Wallace.  Referring to his drum part in "Sailor's Tale", Wallace writes, "I really like what I'm doing, so much so, that I might have to steal it back from myself!"

Track listing

Disc 1
"Cirkus" (Robert Fripp, Peter Sinfield) 10:08
"Pictures of a City" (Fripp, Sinfield) 8:53
"Sailor's Tale" (Fripp) 15:32
"The Letters" (Fripp, Sinfield) 4:48
"Lady of the Dancing Water" (Fripp, Sinfield) 2:52
"Cadence and Cascade" (Fripp, Sinfield) 4:24

Disc 2
"Get Thy Bearings" (Donovan Leitch) 13:24
"The Court of the Crimson King" (Ian McDonald, Sinfield) 8:09
"Ladies of the Road" (Fripp, Sinfield) 9:05
"21st Century Schizoid Man" (Fripp, Michael Giles, Greg Lake, McDonald, Sinfield) 8:58
"Mars: The Bringer of War" (Gustav Holst, arr. Fripp, Collins, Burrell, Wallace) 9:12

Personnel
Robert Fripp - guitar, mellotron
Boz Burrell - bass guitar, vocals
Mel Collins - saxophone, flute, mellotron
Ian Wallace - drums, vocals
Peter Sinfield - words, sounds & visions

Produced by David Singleton and Alex Mundy.

References

2001 live albums
King Crimson Collector's Club albums
Plymouth, Devon